Doug Clement (born 15 July 1933) is a Canadian sprinter. He competed in the men's 400 metres at the 1952 Summer Olympics. He won a silver medal in the 4 x 440 yards relay at the 1954 British Empire and Commonwealth Games alongside Terry Tobacco, Joe Foreman, and Laird Sloan. Clement attended the University of Oregon and University of British Columbia, where he obtained undergraduate and medical degrees respectively. He was also responsible for the introduction of sports medicine to Canada. Along with his wife, Diane, they have both been an integral part of athletics in British Columbia.

Biography
Clement was born Montreal, Quebec, in 1933. He attended the University of Oregon on a track scholarship in the 1950s.

Clement competed at two Olympic Games. At the 1952 Summer Olympics in Helsinki, he competed in the men's 400 metres, but finished in last place in his heat. He was also part of the Canadian team for the men's 4 × 400 metres relay, with the team finishing in fourth place. Four years later, at the 1956 Summer Olympics in Melbourne, Clement competed in the men's 800 metres, but again did not get out of the heats. Once again, he was also part of the team for the men's 4 × 400 metres relay, finishing in fifth place.

In between the two Olympic Games, Clememt also represented Canada at the 1954 British Empire and Commonwealth Games in Vancouver. In the men's 4 × 440 yards relay, he was part of the team that won the silver medal. He then went to the University of British Columbia, studying for a medical degree, before retiring from sport in 1959.

Clement went on to become a medical researcher, and taught at Simon Fraser University and the University of British Columbia. His wife, Diane also competed in the athletics events at the 1956 Summer Olympics, with the two of them forming a track club in 1962.

Clement has been inducted into the University of British Columbia Hall of Fame and the British Columbia Sports Halls of Fame, along with being inducted into the Canadian Olympic Hall of Fame. He was also made an Order of Canada in 1992. In 2019, his wife was awarded with the Order of Canada too.

References

External links
 

1933 births
Living people
Athletes (track and field) at the 1952 Summer Olympics
Athletes (track and field) at the 1956 Summer Olympics
Canadian male sprinters
Canadian male middle-distance runners
Olympic track and field athletes of Canada
Athletes (track and field) at the 1954 British Empire and Commonwealth Games
Athletes (track and field) at the 1958 British Empire and Commonwealth Games
Commonwealth Games silver medallists for Canada
Commonwealth Games medallists in athletics
Athletes from Montreal
Medallists at the 1954 British Empire and Commonwealth Games